Alfred, Count de Baillet Latour (1901 – 28 September 1980) was a Belgian count.

End of the House of Baillet

Alfred was the last grandson of Ferdinand de Baillet-Latour, Governor of Antwerp and a nephew of Henri II, Count de Baillet-Latour (1876–1942): 3rd president of the International Olympic Committee.

His mother was viscountess Antoinette de Spoelberch, and belonged to the owners of Artois holding. He started his professional career at the Artois brewery in 1936 and became its president in 1947.

He died without heirs, and the family fortune was, according to his will, used to found the Artois-Baillet Latour Foundation.

Sources 
 Francis Dierckxsens, Familie de Baillet-Latour. Van Bourgondië tot Brasschaat, Brasschaat
 Biografie van de familie de Baillet Latour

Counts of Baillet-Latour
20th-century Belgian businesspeople
Belgian philanthropists
1901 births
1980 deaths
20th-century philanthropists